This is a list of J2 League transfers made during both winter and summer transfer windows of the 2023 season by each club. The winter transfer window will go from 6 January to 31 March, while the summer transfer window will go from 21 July to 18 August. Free agents will be allowed from 8 September.

Blaublitz Akita

Fagiano Okayama

Fujieda MYFC

Iwaki FC

JEF United Chiba

Júbilo Iwata
Due to a ban imposed by FIFA, after an illegal breach of contract between Fabián González and an unnamed Thai club, Júbilo will be unable to make any new signings from outside of the 2022 club system during both transfer windows of the 2023 season. Players out on loan can normally return to the club. Tokyo International University graduate Shu Morooka was scheduled to join Júbilo for the 2023 season, but as the club received a transfer ban, his provisional contract with Júbilo was cancelled, and he later joined Kashima Antlers. The club filed an appeal about the CAS decision over the subject, but it was denied.

Machida Zelvia

Mito HollyHock

Montedio Yamagata

Oita Trinita

Omiya Ardija

Renofa Yamaguchi

Roasso Kumamoto

Shimizu S-Pulse

Thespakusatsu Gunma

Tochigi SC

Tokushima Vortis

Tokyo Verdy

Vegalta Sendai

Ventforet Kofu

V-Varen Nagasaki

Zweigen Kanazawa

See also
List of J1 League football transfers 2023
List of J3 League football transfers 2023
List of Japan Football League football transfers 2023

References

External links
J2 League 2023 Transfers
J.League News 
JFA/J.League 2022 DSPs to fully join the league on 2023

2023
Transfers